Ivan Tsarevich and the Gray Wolf 2 also commonly known as Prince Ivan and the Grey Wolf 2 is a 2013 Russian full-length traditionally-animated film directed by Vladimir Toropchin.

Plot
One day the Scholar Cat reads Pushkin's poem Ruslan and Lyudmila aloud; Vasilisa listens and dreams of romance and adventure.

Ivan and Vasilisa have been married for a year already and are the second persons of the state. Ivan is almost always busy with state affairs, in fact having the role of the War Minister, while his wife is bored. Because of this, the couple quarrel, and the King with the Wolf and the Cat think how to reconcile them. The Cat appeals for help to the "villain in retirement" Chernomor, who has long lost his beard and now is working as a clown. He is promised the role of Othello in the theater of the faraway kingdom as an award for the successful abduction of Vasilisa, since in his soul he is a tragedian. But because of the sorcerer's sister, Naina's bat, and the "two-way curse" of Chernomor's beard of these heroes, there is confusion in "place of destination", a flight to the Moon and much more...

Cast
 Nikita Yefremov - Ivan Tsarevich
 Aleksandr Boyarsky - Gray Wolf
 Mikhail Boyarsky - Scholar Cat
 Tatiana Bunina - Vasilisa
 Ivan Okhlobystin - The King
 Irina Rakhmanova - Frog
 Maksim Sergeev - Chernomor
 Andrei Lyovin - heroes
 Anatoly Petrov - Elder
 Elena Shulman - mermaid
 Ekaterina Gorokhovskaya - Naina

Awards
The film received the Best Animated Film prize at the 2014 Golden Eagle Awards.

References

External links
 
 Official website
 Credit Ivan Tsarevich and the Gray Wolf 2

Melnitsa Animation Studio animated films
Russian animated fantasy films
2013 animated films
2013 films
Russian animated feature films
Animated adventure films
Animated comedy films
2010s fantasy comedy films
2010s adventure comedy films
Films about wolves
Animated films based on Slavic mythology
Films based on fairy tales
2013 comedy films
2010s children's animated films